Palaeophanes taiwanensis is a species of moth in the family Arrhenophanidae. It is found in wet forests within the central mountain range of Taiwan at elevations of 700 to 1000 m.

The length of the forewings is 4.8-5.8 mm for males and about 9 mm for females.

Etymology
The specific name denotes the country of origin of the type material.

External links
Family Arrhenophanidae

Arrhenophanidae
Moths described in 2003